Palance is a surname. Notable people with the surname include:

Holly Palance (born 1950), American actress and journalist
Jack Palance (1919–2006), American actor of Ukrainian descent
Michael Palance (born 1970), American actor and producer
Nick Palance, American singer, musician, songwriter, and actor